Albert Edward Dyer (born 20 December 1886) was an English footballer who played as an inside-forward for Southampton in the 1900s.

Football career
Dyer was born in Portsmouth and played youth football in Southampton where he was spotted by Southampton F.C. for whom he signed in the 1906 close season.

He spent most of his career at The Dell in the reserves and made his solitary first-team appearance at Northampton Town on 6 April 1907 when Sam Jepp was taken ill shortly before kick-off. Dyer played at inside-right with Frank Jefferis moving to the left and Wally Radford moving into the centre-forward position. The match finished 4–2 to Southampton, with two goals from Radford and one each from Patten and Mouncher.

Dyer remained with the "Saints" until September 1908 playing reserve-team football. He then briefly joined Gainsborough Trinity of The Football League, but returned to Hampshire within a month and was taken on by Eastleigh Athletic, whom he helped win the Hampshire Senior Cup in 1909.

Dyer then moved between various local clubs until his football  career was ended by the First World War.

References

External links
Football career details

1886 births
Footballers from Portsmouth
Year of death unknown
English footballers
Association football inside forwards
Southampton F.C. players
Gainsborough Trinity F.C. players
Eastleigh Athletic F.C. players
Woolston F.C. players
Bitterne Guild F.C. players
Romsey Town F.C. players
Southern Football League players
Southampton Cambridge F.C. players